HMS Ulysses was the debut novel by Scottish author Alistair MacLean. Originally published in 1955, it was also released by Fontana Books in 1960.  MacLean's experiences in the Royal Navy during World War II provided the background and the Arctic convoys to Murmansk provided the basis for the story, which was written at a publisher's request after he'd won a short-story competition the previous year.

Plot
The novel features HMS Ulysses, a light cruiser that is well armed and among the fastest ships in the world. Her crew is pushed well beyond the limits of endurance and the book starts in the aftermath of a mutiny. Ulysses puts to sea again to escort FR-77, a vital convoy heading for Murmansk. They are beset by numerous challenges: an unusually fierce Arctic storm, German ships and U-boats, as well as air attacks. All slowly reduce the convoy from 32 ships to only five. Ulysses is sunk in a failed attempt to ram a German cruiser after all her other weapons had been destroyed.

The book uses a set of events to paint moving portrayals of the crew and the human aspects of the war. Maclean's heroes are not especially motivated by ideals, they rarely excel at more than one task and they are overcome by a respectable enemy. It is their resilience that pushes these seamen to acts of heroism. The realism of the descriptions, the believable motivations of the characters and the simplicity of the line of events make the story all the more credible, though the number of coincidental accidents that plague the crew is startling.

Ships featured in HMS Ulysses
HMS Ulysses is similar to the real  cruisers.

HMS Stirling is an obsolete World War I-era  of the Ceres sub-group (referred to as Cardiff Class in the novel). Stirling is virtually untouched during most of the novel, until the final act where Stirling is repeatedly attacked by dive bombers .

Aircraft carriers Defender, Invader, Wrestler and Blue Ranger, are American-built escort carriers. Accidents and enemy attacks conspire to remove all the aircraft carriers from service before the convoy is even halfway to Russia. Defender in particular is rendered inoperable due to a freak accident: the flight deck is partially torn off during a heavy storm.

Smaller escorts included HMS Sirrus, an S-class destroyer, the most newly built warship in the escort group. HMS Vectra and HMS Viking, World War I-vintage s. HMS Baliol, a Type 1  described as "diminutive" and completely unseaworthy for the harsh weather of the North Atlantic.

Background
Alistair Maclean had written a short story, which was published to acclaim. A literary agent asked him to write a novel and Maclean originally refused, believing there was no future in it. However his boat business failed so he decided to write a novel. The book was based on real life convoys Maclean had participated in when a sailor aboard HMS Royalist.

Maclean later described his writing process:
I drew a cross square, lines down representing the characters, lines across representing chapters 1-15. Most of the characters died, in fact only one survived the book, but when I came to the end the graph looked somewhat lopsided, there were too many people dying in the first, fifth and tenth chapters so I had to rewrite it, giving an even dying space throughout. I suppose it sounds cold blooded and calculated, but that's the way I did it.

Reception
The book sold a quarter of a million copies in hardback in Britain in the first six months of publication. It went on to sell millions more.

Literary significance and criticism
The novel received good critical notices, with a number of reviewers putting it in the same class as two other 1950s classic tales of World War II at sea, Herman Wouk's The Caine Mutiny and Nicholas Monsarrat's The Cruel Sea.

Allusions/references from other works
The same background of the World War II Murmansk convoys, with the combination of extreme belligerent action and inhospitable nature pushing protagonists to the edge of endurance and beyond, appears in Dutch novelist Jan de Hartog's The Captain (1967).  Comparisons may also be drawn with Wolfgang Ott's 1957 novel Sharks and Little Fish, written from the viewpoint of a sailor who serves on surface ships and submarines of the World War II German navy, the Kriegsmarine.

The use of ship names derived from classical mythology is a well-established practice of the Royal Navy. However, commentator Bill Baley suggests that the choice of Ulysses might have been less than accidental. "Unlike in Joyce's famous book, there are here no specific scenes clearly reminiscent of specific ones in Homer's Odyssey; but overall, it was Homer's Ulysses who gave Western culture the enduring template of a long and harrowing sea voyage where peril waits at every moment and of which few of the crew would survive to see the end."

References to HMS Ulysses in other works
Valentin Pikul chose a quotation from the novel as an epigraph to his Requiem for Convoy PQ-17.

Film, TV and theatrical adaptations

Abandoned film projects
Film rights were bought by Robert Clark of Associated British Picture Corporation in the 1950s for £30,000. He arranged for a script to be written by R. C. Sheriff, who had just adapted The Dambusters for Associated British; because of the amount of naval detail included, it proved troublesome for Sherriff. However, ABPC never made the film. Another proposed film version was announced by the Rank Organisation at the Cannes Film Festival in 1980 but then was abandoned when Rank pulled out of filmmaking.

HMS Ulysses has never been filmed but it was adapted by Nick McCarty for a BBC Radio 4 play of the same name which was first aired on 14 June 1997 in the Classic Play series. It starred Sir Derek Jacobi as Captain Vallery and Sir Donald Sinden as Admiral Starr.

Comic adaptation

Japanese Manga
HMS Ulysses was serialized in Weekly Shōnen Sunday as Japanese Manga arranged by Kai Takizawa and illustrated by Taiyou Noguchi in 1970. But the Manga has never been published as the Tankōbon.

See also

 Arctic convoys of World War II
 Convoy PQ 17, an Arctic convoy almost destroyed by the Germans in 1942
 JW 58,  the convoy MacLean sailed with on Operation Tungsten
 The Captain (novel) with the same background

References

External links
 Book review at AlistairMacLean.com

Novels by Alistair MacLean
1955 British novels
Novels set during World War II
Novels set in the Arctic
William Collins, Sons books
Ulysses, HMS
1955 debut novels